Gjúki (also Gebicca, Gifica, Gibica, Gebicar, Gibicho or Gippich) was the King of the Burgundians in the Germanic heroic legend. He was a member of the Niflungar family, and the father of Gundomar I, Giselher and Gunther.

He is mentioned in Widsith as Gifica and as Gjúki in the eddic poem Atlakviða, where he was the father of Gunnar (see Gunther). As one of the earliest kings of the Nibelungs, the clan is called the Gjúkungar.

In the Prose Edda, Snorri Sturluson says that Gjúki was the father of sons Gunnar and Hogni and a daughter Gudrun. Gotthorm (slayer of Sigurd) is his stepson from his wife Grimhild's previous marriage.

The Prose Edda mentions Gudny, a second daughter of Gjúki and Grimhild. In the Gudrunarkvida, this second daughter is named Gullrond.

See also
Völsunga saga
Tribes of Widsith
Rosengarten zu Worms

|-

|-

References

4th-century births
407 deaths
Kings of the Burgundians
Nibelung tradition
Heroes in Norse myths and legends
Völsung cycle
4th-century monarchs in Europe
5th-century monarchs in Europe